BBV may refer to:

Science
 Black beetle virus
 Blood-borne virus

Organisations
 Banco Bilbao Vizcaya, which merged into BBVA
 BBV Hagen, German basketball club
 Bill & Ben Video, production company
 Bolivian Stock Exchange (BBV)

Other
 Karnai language, by ISO 639 code
 Nero-Mer Airport, by IATA code